Jesmond Library is a public library in Jesmond, Newcastle upon Tyne, England, built in 1963. It is a Grade II listed building. Since 2013 it has been run by Friends of Jesmond Library, a group of local volunteers.

Description
The building, designed by Harry Faulkner Brown of Williamson, Faulkner, Brown and Partners, was erected in 1962–63. It was awarded the RIBA Bronze Medal in 1965. Situated on a corner site, the lending area, connected to a two-storey administrative block, is a small circular building with a steel frame painted black, windows above precast panels of pink granite aggregate, and a flat roof. The external windows and panels have a sawtooth arrangement.

Closure and re-opening
After a budget review, Newcastle City Council decided to reduce the number of libraries in the city, and announced in March 2013 that Jesmond Library would be closed. Subsequently, a group of local residents formed Friends of Jesmond Library, to oppose the closure, and with a contingency plan for volunteers to run the library. The library closed on 29 July 2013, and was re-opened by Friends of Jesmond Library, a limited company and a registered charity, on 21 September 2013.

The Council remains the owner of the building, and a 20-year lease with the council was signed on 1 July 2016. The number of library volunteers in 2017 was about 90. At the suggestion of local residents, the library is also a community hub.

References

External links

Grade II listed library buildings
Grade II listed buildings in Tyne and Wear
Public libraries in Tyne and Wear
Library buildings completed in 1963
Buildings and structures in Newcastle upon Tyne